Beregovoye is a rural locality (a selo) in Krivinsky Selsoviet, Pankrushikhinsky District, Altai Krai, Russia. The population was 283 as of 2013. There are 4 streets.

Geography 
Beregovoye is located 17 km southwest of Pankrushikha (the district's administrative centre) by road. Beryozovsky is the nearest rural locality.

References 

Rural localities in Pankrushikhinsky District